The 1996–97 Divizia A was the seventy-ninth season of Divizia A, the top-level football league of Romania.

Teams

League table

Positions by round

Results

Top goalscorers

Champion squad

References

Liga I seasons
Romania
1996–97 in Romanian football